Cleiton Conceição (born November 1, 1978 in Cruz das Almas, Bahia) is a Brazilian boxer, who represented his native country in the middleweight division at the 2000 Summer Olympics in Sydney, Australia. There he was eliminated in the first round by Jeff Lacy of the United States.

References

External links
Esporte Profile

1979 births
Living people
Middleweight boxers
Boxers at the 2000 Summer Olympics
Olympic boxers of Brazil
Brazilian male boxers